The 1965–66 La Liga was the 35th season of La Liga since its establishment. The season started on September 4, 1965, and finished on April 3, 1966.

Team locations

League table

Results

Relegation play-offs 

|}

Pichichi Trophy

External links 
  Official LFP Site

1965 1966
1965–66 in Spanish football leagues
Spain